Acrocercops leptalea is a moth of the family Gracillariidae. It is known from Queensland, Australia.

References

leptalea
Moths of Australia
Moths described in 1900